Usatove (Ukrainian: Усатове) is a village in Ukraine, in the Odesa Raion of Odesa Oblast. It hosts the administration of Usatove rural hromada, one of the hromadas of Ukraine. The population is 7,925 people.

Until 18 July 2020, Usatove belonged to Biliaivka Raion. The raion was abolished in July 2020 as part of the administrative reform of Ukraine, which reduced the number of raions of Odesa Oblast to seven. The area of Biliaivka Raion was merged into Odesa Raion.

Flag
The Flag presents Three Primary colors, Alizarin Crimson, White, and Cerulean. The non-Primary colors are Rajah (Gold-ish tint at the church), Summer Green (A Green-Yellow Color), and Satin Sheen Gold. The Church represented is the Church of the Nativity of the Virgin. At the bottom, it shows a Shashka, and an Arrow.

Culture
Usatove culture (Ukrainian: Усатівська культура; usativska kultura), is a Neolithic culture of the late 3rd millennium BC that existed in southwestern Ukraine along the lower Dnister River and the area near the Dnister Estuary. It takes its name from a site excavated by Mykhailo Boltenko in Odesa oblast in 1921. The culture is classified as a late Trypilian culture. Usatove culture had developed enough distinctive cultural traits through contact with steppe tribes, Subcaucasia, and the Mediterranean world to be considered a separate archeological entity. Usatove people engaged in animal husbandry and fishing and (to a lesser degree) agriculture. Excavations in Usatove have revealed surface dwellings with stone walls, pottery with corded and painted ornamentation, earthenware figurines of women, and copper weapons and adornments. Eighteen Usatove kurhans, surrounded by cromlechs, have been unearthed. The deceased Usatove people were buried in a flexed position on their sides; tribal leaders were in the central chambers of the structures. grave goods included weapons (For soldiers that fought) and adornments. Regional variants of Tripolye C2 in western Ukraine and Moldova might have played an important role in the origins of the northwestern Indo-European language branches. In particular, the Tripolye C2 Usatove culture might have played a significant role as the intermediary between Proto-Indo-European and the Germanic branch. The influence of the Usatovo culture extended up the Dniester, and upper-Dniester Tripolye C2 cultures extended this chain of social interaction into southeastern Poland during the final centuries of the Trichterbecker or TRB culture, prior to the appearance of the Corded Ware horizon there. The Proto-Indo-European dialects that would ultimately form the root of Pre-Germanic might. It have spread up the Dniester from the Usatove culture through a nested series of patrons and clients, eventually being spoken in some of the late TRB communities between the upper Dniester and the Vistula. These late TRB communities later evolved into early Corded Ware communities, and it was the Corded Ware horizon that provided the medium through which the Pre-Germanic dialects spread over a wider region.

Grave Customs 
The two population groups can be clearly distinguished in their burial/grave customs. Signs of the ancient Tripol'e cultures are found in burials in cemeteries, which were relatively new for these bodies. In contrast, the new rulers of the steppes buried in richly furnished kurgans, especially with weapons such as bronze daggers and axes. A typical accessory are the stelae that are widespread in the steppe cultures.

Ceramics 
There is pottery in the richly banded, high-fired Tripol'e style as well as simple steppe pottery with cord decoration. Prestige pottery of the Maikop culture from the north-eastern shore of the Black Sea was only found in kurgan tombs. In contrast, Cernavodă pottery was only found up to about 2%, and never in graves. cultures.

Ecology 

Not only the Maikop pottery points to long-distance trade across the entire Black Sea. Findings of simple glass beads point to long-distance trade with the Aegean region. All known Usatove settlements are situated at river mouths. The first indications of grain cultivation (often millet and oats, as well as emmer, common wheat, barley and peas) were found in Usatove.

Notable Places
 Church of the Nativity of the Virgin (Usatove)
 Church of the Intercession

See also
 Odesa catacombs

References

External links 
  Usatove on the website of the Verkhovna Rada of Ukraine
  Usatove Culture
  Usatove Culture 2
  Usatove Culture and the separation of Pre-Germanic Usatove
  Church of the Intercession (Usatove)

Villages in Odesa Raion
Cucuteni–Trypillia culture
Usatove Hromada